Bertsch–Oceanview is a census-designated place (CDP) in Del Norte County, California, United States. Its population is 2,520 as of the 2020 census, up from 2,436 from the 2010 census. The Elk Valley Rancheria Indian reservation is located within Bertsch–Oceanview.

Demographics

2010
The 2010 United States Census reported that Bertsch–Oceanview had a population of 2,436. The racial makeup of Bertsch–Oceanview was 1,810 (74.3%) White, 3 (0.1%) African American, 294 (12.1%) Native American, 94 (3.9%) Asian, 0 (0.0%) Pacific Islander, 81 (3.3%) from other races, and 154 (6.3%) from two or more races. Hispanic or Latino of any race were 310 persons (12.7%).

The Census reported that 2,434 people (99.9% of the population) lived in households, 2 (0.1%) lived in non-institutionalized group quarters, and 0 (0%) were institutionalized.

There were 905 households, out of which 308 (34.0%) had children under the age of 18 living in them, 421 (46.5%) were opposite-sex married couples living together, 119 (13.1%) had a female householder with no husband present, 60 (6.6%) had a male householder with no wife present. There were 81 (9.0%) unmarried opposite-sex partnerships, and 12 (1.3%) same-sex married couples or partnerships. 227 households (25.1%) were made up of individuals, and 88 (9.7%) had someone living alone who was 65 years of age or older. The average household size was 2.69. There were 600 families (66.3% of all households); the average family size was 3.20.

The population was spread out, with 633 people (26.0%) under the age of 18, 198 people (8.1%) aged 18 to 24, 571 people (23.4%) aged 25 to 44, 698 people (28.7%) aged 45 to 64, and 336 people (13.8%) who were 65 years of age or older. The median age was 38.5 years. For every 100 females, there were 98.2 males. For every 100 females age 18 and over, there were 95.6 males.

The homeowner vacancy rate was 4.0%; the rental vacancy rate was 5.2%. 1,713 people (70.3% of the population) lived in owner-occupied housing units and 721 people (29.6%) lived in rental housing units.

2000
As of the census of 2000, there were 2,238 people, 814 households, and 570 families residing in the CDP. The racial makeup of the CDP was 80.12% White, 0.89% Black or African American, 9.61% Native American, 2.46% Asian, 0.04% Pacific Islander, 3.13% from other races, and 3.75% from two or more races. 9.12% of the population were Hispanic or Latino of any race.

There were 814 households, out of which 34.4% had children under the age of 18 living with them, 49.3% were married couples living together, 14.4% had a female householder with no husband present, and 29.9% were non-families. 22.6% of all households were made up of individuals, and 7.0% had someone living alone who was 65 years of age or older. The average household size was 2.75 and the average family size was 3.21.

In the CDP, the population was spread out, with 30.1% under the age of 18, 7.3% from 18 to 24, 28.2% from 25 to 44, 23.7% from 45 to 64, and 10.7% who were 65 years of age or older. The median age was 36 years. For every 100 females, there were 95.8 males. For every 100 females age 18 and over, there were 92.8 males.

The median income for a household in the CDP was $26,300, and the median income for a family was $32,500. Males had a median income of $35,385 versus $21,250 for females. The per capita income for the CDP was $12,661. About 15.5% of families and 18.1% of the population were below the poverty line, including 18.2% of those under age 18 and 6.8% of those age 65 or over.

Climate

Politics

See also

References

Census-designated places in Del Norte County, California
Census-designated places in California
Populated coastal places in California